Francisco "Paco" Fortes Calvo (born 4 January 1955) is a Spanish former football forward and manager.

Even though he also played for Barcelona, his career was mainly associated with Farense in Portugal, either as a player or manager.

Playing career
Born in Barcelona, Catalonia, Fortes emerged through local FC Barcelona's youth ranks, going on to spend four years with the first team and also being loaned one season to CD Málaga. He only featured regularly for the former in 1975–76 – 23 matches, three goals – adding 11 UEFA Cup appearances with three goals in two separate campaigns. He made his La Liga debut on 5 October 1975 at the age of 20, in a 3–0 home win against Granada CF.

Released by the Blaugrana in 1979, Fortes signed for neighbours RCD Español, staying with the club for three seasons. Subsequently, he joined Real Valladolid still in the top flight, going on to appear in 175 games and score 14 goals in the competition. He earned his only cap for Spain on 16 November 1975, playing 15 minutes in the 2–2 draw in Romania for the UEFA Euro 1976 qualifiers.

In the summer of 1984, the 29-year-old Fortes signed with S.C. Farense in Portugal, being relegated from the Primeira Liga in his first year but winning immediate promotion. He appeared in more than 100 official matches for the Algarve side in his five-year stint.

Coaching career
In late 1988, aged 33, Fortes retired from football and immediately started coaching Farense. He was in charge of eight games in that season, winning four and drawing two, but the team eventually could not escape relegation after ranking 18th. Promotion befell in the following campaign, as champions.

Fortes remained at the helm of the club for one full decade, managing four consecutive top-eight finishes from 1991 to 1995, including a best-ever fourth in 1994–95 as Farense qualified to the UEFA Cup for the first time in their history. He was dismissed after the 21st round in 1998–99, moving to neighbouring Imortal D.C. of the second tier.

Early into 2001–02, after only six games with C.F. União de Lamas (also division two), Fortes returned to his beloved Farense, in the midst of a severe financial crisis. He was one of four coaches during the season – this included his former player Hajry Redouane – as the team were eventually relegated. After leaving midway through the following campaign, he spent two full seasons and part of a third with C.D. Pinhalnovense in the third division.

After reuniting with Redouane at Raja Casablanca, Fortes returned to Pinhalnovense for one final year, then lost all connection with the football world. Undergoing serious financial problems, he contacted former club Barcelona's Agrupació Barça Veterans, who arranged for him to work as a controller in the Port of Barcelona.

Honours

Player
Barcelona
Copa del Rey: 1977–78

Valladolid
Copa de la Liga: 1984

Farense
Segunda Liga: 1985–86

Manager
Farense
Segunda Liga: 1989–90

References

External links

1955 births
Living people
Footballers from Barcelona
Spanish footballers
Association football forwards
La Liga players
Segunda División players
FC Barcelona Atlètic players
FC Barcelona players
CD Málaga footballers
RCD Espanyol footballers
Real Valladolid players
Primeira Liga players
Liga Portugal 2 players
S.C. Farense players
Spain amateur international footballers
Spain international footballers
Spanish expatriate footballers
Expatriate footballers in Portugal
Spanish expatriate sportspeople in Portugal
Spanish football managers
Primeira Liga managers
Liga Portugal 2 managers
S.C. Farense managers
C.D. Pinhalnovense managers
Raja CA managers
Spanish expatriate football managers
Expatriate football managers in Portugal
Expatriate football managers in Morocco
Spanish expatriate sportspeople in Morocco
Botola managers